The Taiwan Water Corporation (TWC) is a state-owned water utility providing water supply to most of Taiwan and offshore islands. The company is headquartered in North District, Taichung.

History
On 16 December 1972, President Chiang Ching-kuo instructed that a water corporation be set up to develop and unified public water supply system island-wide. On 1 April 1973, the preparatory office for Taiwan Water Corporation was set up by Taiwan Provincial Government. Taiwan Water Corporation was then inaugurated by the provincial government in 1974.

Former chairman Hsu Hsiang-kun was arrested on bribery and corruption charges in September 2007, and indicted in August 2014. Hsu had contracted Kintech Technology Company to expand two water purification facilities in 2002. The project deadline was extended twice to November 2003 and March 2005. Hsu then accepted NT$5 million to grant Kintech a third extension to September 2007, by which time the project was completed.

Organizational structure
 Department of Planning
 Department of Public Works
 Department of Water Supply
 Department of Business
 Department of Finance
 Department of Materials
 Department of Water Quality
 Department of Industrial Safety and Environment Protection
 Department of Information Management
 Department of General Affairs
 Department of Accounting
 Department of Human Resources
 Department of Civil Service Ethics
 Water Loss Management Center
 Bidding Center

Branch offices

 1st Branch: Keelung City
 2nd Branch: Taoyuan City
 3rd Branch: Hsinchu County and Miaoli County
 4th Branch: Taichung City and Nantou County
 5th Branch: Yunlin County and Chiayi County
 6th Branch: Tainan City
 7th Branch: Kaohsiung City and Penghu County
 8th Branch: Yilan County
 9th Branch: Hualien County
 10th Branch: Taitung County
 11th Branch: Changhua County
 12th Branch: New Taipei City
 Pingtung Branch: Pingtung County

See also
 Water supply and sanitation in Taiwan
 Water pollution
 Water security
 Energy in Taiwan
 List of companies of Taiwan

References

External links

 

1974 establishments in Taiwan
Companies based in Taichung
Government-owned companies of Taiwan
Public utilities established in 1974
Water in Taiwan